Violence against women in Guatemala reached severe levels during the long-running Guatemalan Civil War (1960-1996), and the continuing impact of that conflict has contributed to the present high levels of violence against women in that nation. During the armed conflict, rape was used as a weapon of war.

Femicide
Femicide in Guatemala is an extremely serious problem. According to a 2002 report by the Small Arms Survey, Guatemala has the third highest rate of femicide in the world, behind only El Salvador and Jamaica. According to official figures, 560 women were murdered in the country in 2012, 631 in 2011 and 695 in 2010, though the exact number is not known.

Murders rarely result in any conviction and often are not properly investigated; less than 4 percent of all homicide cases result in conviction for the perpetrators. Perpetrators are confident they will get away with murder, in part because of the "machismo" culture in Latin America. This culture allows women to be treated as objects rather than humans; equality and basic rights granted to men are not even in question for women. Rape culture and victim blaming are the tactics that go along with machismo, and both men and women largely agree with the misogynistic tendencies that have survived for so long.

Attacks on women activists
Women who work as public activists, such as human rights defenders, including activists working to protect land and natural resources, face violence, threats, reprisal, and illegal arrests. Such acts are often committed by government authorities and security forces.

In Guatemala, women activists experience at least one attack each day on average, and an estimated eighty-three percent of these activists are land and natural resource defenders. Factors such as foreign investments, typically in mining, have created conflict with native communities fighting to defend their land rights and natural resources. As a result, indigenous women are primary victims of threats and violence.

Sexual violence
Sexual violence is widespread in Guatemala. There are about 10,000 cases of reported rape per year, but the total number is likely much higher because of under-reporting due to social stigma. According to Doctors without Borders, "Survivors [of sexual violence] are stigmatized and they cannot easily find treatment in Guatemala yet. There are no resources and too little comprehension of patients’ needs by the doctors." The nation's health care institutions are ill-equipped and unwilling to provide adequate care for the thousands of women victimized by sexual violence each year.

Sexual violence against adolescent girls 
Many survivors are adolescent girls, leading to Guatemala having the highest teen pregnancy and preteen pregnancy rates in Latin America. Girls as young as 10 years old are impregnated by rape, and they usually carry these pregnancies to birth. Most of these instances of sexual violence are perpetrated by the girl's father or other close male relative (89%). These men do not suffer consequences largely because of the lack of education, poverty, and lack of social respect for women. According to photo activist Linda Forsell, most young girls face expulsion from school if they are visibly pregnant.

Sexual Violence as a War Tactic 
Sexual violence is often used as a tactic in war, and many women, particularly women from indigenous tribes, often become sex slaves to soldiers and are subjected to rape and other forms of sexual violence. When a community is occupied or destroyed, an entire community of women may be subjected to rape and sexual or domestic slavery, affecting the prosperity and health of the community after a conflict’s end.

In February 2016, the Sepur Zarco trial convicted two ex-soldiers of crimes against humanity for their sexual abuse of 11 indigenous Q’eqchi’ women, the forced disappearance of the women's husbands, and the murder of a woman and her two daughters. Expert witnesses called by the prosecution included Brazilian feminist academic Rita Segato. The women of the Q’eqchi” community received substantial reparations for the damage done by the convicted soldiers. This is the first time a case of sexual slavery during armed conflict has been considered in court. In Guatemala, it was the first time any form of sexual violence during a conflict had been settled in court.

Sex trafficking

Citizen and foreign women and girls have been victims of sex trafficking in Guatemala. They are raped and experience physical and psychological trauma in brothels, homes, and other locations. The illegal transporting and sexual assault of migrants from Latin America to the United States is a problem.

Long-Term Health Problems 
Common health problems that victims of sexual assault in Guatemala often suffer include HIV/AIDS, unwanted pregnancy, Hepatitis B, syphilis, Chlamydia, and Gonorrhoea. Because health care is not readily accessible and education about sexual violence not prevalent, avoidable and treatable health problems often go untreated.

The emotional and psychological impact of sexual violence often requires professional health care to treat, but the stigma surrounding sexual violence makes it difficult for people to discuss.

International Organizations. 
International organizations like Doctors Without Borders try to fill the gap in Guatemala's health care and provide assistance to victims of sexual violence. In 2007, Doctors Without Borders opened a clinic in Guatemala City that provides comprehensive care for such victims. The organization is also implementing educational programs in Guatemala City that aim to end the prevalence of sexual violence there.

The Center for Gender and Refugee Studies investigates and reports on sexual violence in Guatemala, working with human rights advocates, government groups, and community groups based in Guatemala. They have published papers on the ineffectiveness of Guatemala's Law Against Femicide and Other Forms of Violence Against Women, passed in 2008. They also provide resources for attorney representing female victims of sexual violence, and help advocates in Guatemala implement laws that prevent sexual violence. They also educate countries around the world about the prevalence of sexual violence in Guatemala, so that international pressure can be put on the country to prevent sexual violence against women.

Effects of militarization
The increased militarization of Guatemala has resulted in abuse and mistreatment of the people of Guatemala. Militarism spreads a perception of brutality and makes it easier to access weapons, which makes the rates of domestic violence against women go up. Guatemala's military has a substantial history of human rights violations. Murders, torture, and missing people became a daily reality for people in Guatemala. Most findings show that communities where an army is present tend to have more violence against women. The Guatemalan military is also correlated with corruption. Recent records state that the government and military are often associated with criminal activity.

Increased military presence to combat the War on Drugs 
Militarization came to Guatemala in the early 1980s. In Guatemala, as well as in other parts of Latin America, there is an intense "war on drugs", that is a conflict between state forces and drug cartels, which has taken a violent turn. As a result of the war on drugs, there is a widespread presence of the military throughout the country thanks to three military bases in known drug trafficking areas. Jody Williams, a Nobel Peace Prize recipient, said, "The war on drugs and increased militarization in Mexico, Honduras and Guatemala is becoming a war on women."

The military's role in public safety initiatives 
From 2006 to 2011, the budget the military was allotted went from sixty-three million United States dollars to one hundred and seventy-five million dollars. Otto Pérez Molina became the first military official to be elected as president. Shortly after being elected president in 2012, Pérez increased the role of the military in fighting crime. Soldiers now are assigned public safety duties that would normally be reserved for police forces.

As of 2013 there were twenty-one thousand troops deployed to assist in public safety duties.

Violence against indigenous women
Amerindian (indigenous) women in Guatemala face high levels of violence by the military, and state authorities. It is very difficult for indigenous women to obtain justice. Many of them have not received school education, and live in extreme poverty. Girls in indigenous communities do not attend school because of the distance from their homes to school. Indigenous population is estimated at 39.8% of Guatemala's population (in 2012). High illiteracy rates and the fact that they do not speak Spanish makes the justice system limited for them.

During the civil war, many indigenous women were forced into sexual slavery by the military. In 2016, a court in Guatemala ordered two former military officers to pay over $1m (£710,000) to 11 indigenous women whom they held as sex slaves during the civil war.

Child marriage and pregnancy
Early marriage for girls is common in Guatemala; the country has one of the highest rates of child marriage in Latin America. As of 2015, men and women must be at least 18 years of age to marry; sometimes exceptions can be made by judges for girls to be married at 16. Previously, girls could be married at 14 and boys could be married at 16. The age was increased and made the same regardless of gender in hopes to hold both men and women to the same standard. It is estimated that 7% of girls are married before 15 years of age and 30% by 18 years of age. Rates are even higher in rural areas where 53% of females are married before they are 18. Some reasons for early marriage is poverty, rigid gender norms, access to education, and tradition. Older men also provide more financial support to these girls. After marriage, girls are expected to start a family and face a lot of pressure to get pregnant. Teen mothers account for a quarter of births in Guatemala. "Complications in pregnancy and childbirth are the second highest cause of death for 15- to 19-year-old girls globally".

Mob violence
According to data from the National Civil Police of Guatemala, at least 84 people were killed by lynching in Guatemala between January 2012 and May 2015. The lynchings primarily took place in the departments of Huehuetenango, Guatemala and Alta Verapaz. Men accounted for 76 of the lynching deaths, while women accounted for eight.

Guatemala is ranked the 25th most violent country in the world and Guatemalan police have a reputation for being non-responsive to the high crime rates. The lack of security within the government is what encouraged the start of mobs turning to vigilante justice. Unfortunately, much of the crime associated with these mobs is just as bad as the crime they claim they are attempting to prevent. Most of the locals keep quiet for fear of being targeted by these groups themselves, and many of the people participating in the violence are forced to do so.

As in other countries where the population does not trust the authorities, people in Guatemala often enforce informal 'justice' by subjecting to violence and even murdering individuals whom they believe have violated moral standards. For example, in 2015, a 16-year-old girl was lynched and burned alive by a mob after reportedly being accused of being part of a group that killed a taxi driver.

Problems within the justice system
After years of violence, dictatorship, and conflict, Guatemala's public institutions are ineffective, including its justice system. Lack of funding has made the law-enforcement departments ineffective and, seeing how unlikely it is to be charged, criminals are encouraged to continue normalizing this widespread, unchecked violence. Based on the numbers of incidents actually reported and taken to court, only 3% result in any sort of court resolution. Authorities do not always conduct proper investigations. A minority of the reported crimes against women go to trial, and even fewer result in a conviction. According to Nobel Women's Initiative, in the 1980s, 200,000 people were murdered, and thousands of women were raped. Many cases similar to these have not gone to trial. Of the complaints about violence against women that were registered in 2010 by the Judicial Department, only one percent of them resulted in sentencing.

Law enforcement often fails to investigate in a timely manner, and blames the victims of the case. Many women abandon their cases because the stress and hardship put onto them. Without proper trials, investigations, and sentencing, the violence towards women will progressively increase.

Women are often murdered or subjected to violence by family members such as fathers, brothers, stepfathers and husbands, but when they try to report a crime that was done by family members, the women themselves are often treated as criminals for complaining. Discrimination in the justice system is one of the many problems women face in Guatemala. The justice system discriminates against others' race, class, sex, and ethnicity. Discrimination is worst for women who are poor, migrant, young, lesbian, and those that demand justice.

There is a lack of female representation in the political system. As of 2015, only 13.9% of members of Parliament were women.

The justice system is limited for people who do not speak Spanish. This means that the women must be educated in order to protect their rights. The 2008 law against femicide and other forms of violence against women has enforced people to treat women equally. The 2008 law addressed the private and public crimes in Guatemala. Women in Guatemala are often uninformed of their rights and do not have the courage to report the crimes committed against them.

Legislation
Guatemala is a country that has one of the most prevalent rates of violence against women in the world. Instances of gendered violence in Guatemala include domestic violence, sexual violence, human trafficking, incest, and femicide (the deliberate killing of women). In response to violence against women, the government has passed laws and created agencies in order to stunt the high rates of gendered violence in Guatemala in the 1990s: in 1996 it enacted Ley para prevenir, sancionar y erradicar la violencia intrafamiliar (Law on the Prevention, Punishment and Eradication of Domestic Violence). In 2008, it enacted Ley contra el Femicidio y otras Formas de Violencia Contra la Mujer  (Law against Femicide and Other Forms of Violence Against Women), and in 2009 it enacted  Ley contra la violencia sexual, explotación y trata de personas (Law against Sexual Violence, Exploitation and Trafficking in Persons).

Procurador de los Derechos Humanos 
In 2008, the Procurador de los Derechos Humanos (Human Rights Ombudsman) was created, which is an agency that operates with the intention of enforcing citizens' cooperation with human rights laws. Despite these efforts made by Guatemala's government, the number of women who experience gendered violence persists. The ineffectiveness of Procurador de los Derechos Humanos is a result of a multitude of factors including the weakness of the justice system, a lack of clarity surrounding laws made regarding gendered violence, and the absence of free institutions that would aid victims. Despite the intentions of enacting Procurador de los Derechos Humanos, the full potential of its efficiency has not yet been reached.

Legal age of marriage 
More recently, social groups advocating for gender equality in Guatemala helped reform the age at which a girl is able to legally be married. The Angélica Fuentes Foundation and Girl Up (a United Nations youth foundation) together put forth an initiative to change the legal age of marriage in Guatemala from 14 to 18. These advocates had integral roles in the passing of the legislation in January 2016. The leaders of both The Angélica Fuentes Foundation and Girl Up stated that their main goal of pushing for a higher marriage age was to aid the children in Guatemala. Young girls often would be forced to give up their education and be constricted to a life devoted to marriage, however with the marriage age raised young women would be free to pursue other interests. The leader of The Angélica Fuentes Foundation states that it is her hope that this initiative promotes gender equality and an increase in opportunity for young girls in Guatemala, as well as in other Latin American countries.

See also 

 Femicide in Latin America

References

External links
 Feminicidio silenciado 

Guatemala
Women in Guatemala